Kani Shurik may refer to:
 Kani Shurik, Anzal
 Kani Shurik, Sumay-ye Beradust